Raúl Fredy Ferro Olivera (born 13 January 1983) is a Uruguayan retired  footballer .

Career
Ferro joined Centro Atlético Fénix in the summer 2014. He left the club again at the end of 2019. Left without club since the break with Fénix, Ferro announced his retirement on 2 January 2020.

Honours
Danubio
Uruguayan Primera División (1): 2006–07

References

External links
 Profile at Soccerway
 

 The Fourth: Tito Ferro

1983 births
Living people
Uruguayan footballers
Uruguayan expatriate footballers
Association football midfielders
Danubio F.C. players
Club Nacional de Football players
Querétaro F.C. footballers
C.D. Veracruz footballers
Dorados de Sinaloa footballers
Atlético de Rafaela footballers
Liverpool F.C. (Montevideo) players
Centro Atlético Fénix players
Uruguayan Primera División players
Liga MX players
Ascenso MX players
Argentine Primera División players
Expatriate footballers in Mexico
Expatriate footballers in Argentina
Uruguayan expatriate sportspeople in Mexico
Uruguayan expatriate sportspeople in Argentina